

217001–217100 

|-bgcolor=#f2f2f2
| colspan=4 align=center | 
|}

217101–217200 

|-bgcolor=#f2f2f2
| colspan=4 align=center | 
|}

217201–217300 

|-id=257
| 217257 Valemangano ||  || Valeria Mangano (born 1971), a planetary scientist at the Istituto di Fisica dello Spazio Interplanetario in Torino. || 
|}

217301–217400 

|-id=366
| 217366 Mayalin ||  || Maya Lin (born 1959) designed the Vietnam Veterans Memorial in Washington, D.C. (1980–1982) and the Civil Rights Memorial (1988–1989) in Montgomery, Alabama, along with many other monuments and works of art. For a time, she created artificial "asteroids" out of her daughters' discarded toys. || 
|-id=398
| 217398 Tihany ||  || Tihany, a historic village on the northern shore of Lake Balaton on the Tihany Peninsula. || 
|}

217401–217500 

|-id=420
| 217420 Olevsk ||  || Olevsk, an ancient city founded in the times of Kievan Rus. || 
|}

217501–217600 

|-id=510
| 217510 Dewaldroode ||  || Dewald Roode (1940–2009), a South African physicist, mathematician and computer scientist. || 
|-id=576
| 217576 Klausbirkner ||  || Klaus Birkner (born 1959), a long-time amateur astronomer and co-founder of the AAEM Observatory near Velbert, Germany. || 
|}

217601–217700 

|-id=603
| 217603 Grove Creek ||  || Grove Creek Observatory, a professional research facility located at Trunkey Creek, New South Wales, Australia. || 
|-id=628
| 217628 Lugh ||  || Lugh (or Lugus), the Celtic God of the Sun and light. || 
|}

217701–217800 

|-id=726
| 217726 Kitabeppu || 1999 WN || Manabu Kitabeppu (born 1957), born in Kagoshima prefecture, is a retired Japanese baseball player who played for the Hiroshima Toyo Carp. Famous for excellent ball control, Kitabeppu got 213 wins and 1757 strikeouts during his nineteen-year career as a starting pitcher. || 
|}

217801–217900 

|-bgcolor=#f2f2f2
| colspan=4 align=center | 
|}

217901–218000 

|-bgcolor=#f2f2f2
| colspan=4 align=center | 
|}

References 

217001-218000